Mark Thompson (born 1973, Norfolk, England) is a British astronomer, television presenter and writer best known for being one of the presenting team on the BBC show Stargazing Live and is a regular face on Good Morning Britain.

Biography
Thompson has lived in Norfolk all his life and was first enthused about astronomy aged 10 when he saw the rings of Saturn through a telescope. He has remained living in the county because the night skies are very dark and ideal for stargazing.

Thompson had given up his ambition to present on TV and left insurers Aviva to retrain as a pilot when (in 2009) he was picked to become a presenter on the BBC's The One Show. where he lived at Wortwell, near Harleston.

Thompson has been one of a number of amateur astronomers to become a council member of the Royal Astronomical Society.  Since it was founded in 1820 as the Astronomical Society of London (receiving its Royal Charter in 1830 from King William IV) it has had many amateurs on its council, including many of its founding members (of the original 12 founding members in 1820, 11 were amateurs, including the Sir John Herschel, the son of William).  Nigel Calder and Anthony Kinder, both amateurs, were members of the council from 2001–2004.  He is President of the Norwich Astronomical Society.

He is most well known for his role as one of the presenting team of the hit BBC science show Stargazing Live.

In August 2016 Thompson first performed his Spectacular Science Show at the Edinburgh Festival Fringe at the National Museum of Scotland Gilded Balloon venue., he has been touring it around the country to sellout audiences since.

Thompson was awarded an Honorary Doctorate from the University of East Anglia on 16 July 2018.

As of February 2017 Thompson had 76,822 followers on Twitter.

TV appearances and radio broadcasts
 Presenter of astronomy/science items for The One Show Jul 2009 to Oct 2011
 Presenter of Stargazing Live Jan 2011 to present
 Specialist Presenter on the Alan Titchmarsh Show Jan 2012 to 2014
 Guest on The Wright Stuff 12 Jan 2012
 Monthly Night Sky segment on Radio Five Live Jan 2012 to present
 Derren Brown's Apocalypse episode 1 in Oct 2012
 Celebrity Mastermind Contestant 5 Jan 2013
 Regular guest on This Morning March 2014 to 2018
 Guest appearances on Good Morning Britain 2018 to present day
 Contestant on Pointless Celebrities 7 September 2019

Written work
 Columnist for Discovery Space Jul 2010 to present
 Writer for Space Exploration Network Jul 2011 to 2012 
 'A Down to Earth Guide to the Cosmos'  
 'A  Space Travellers Guide to the Solar System' 
 'Philips Stargazing with Mark Thompson' 
 'Philips Astrophotography with Mark Thompson' 
 'Science for Rocketing into Space' 
 'Science for Looking Into Space' 
 'Science for Exploring Outer Space' 
 'Science for Surviving in Space' 
 '101 Facts You Didn't Know About Space'

References

External links
 Official website
 Mark’s Spectacular Science Show website

Living people
1973 births
21st-century British astronomers
BBC television presenters
People from South Norfolk (district)
Aviva people